Zampani railway station (station code:ZPI) is an Indian Railway station, located in Zampani of Guntur district in Andhra Pradesh. It is situated on the Tenali–Repalle branch line and is administered by Guntur railway division of South Coast Railway zone. It is classified as an F-category station in terms of revenue and passenger footfalls.

History 
The Tenali–Repalle branch line, constructed by Madras and Southern Mahratta Railway, was opened in 1916.

Structure and amenities 
The station has roof top solar panels installed by the Indian railways, along with various railway stations and service buildings in the country, as a part of sourcing 500 MW solar energy.

See also 
 List of railway stations in India

References

External links 

Railway stations in Guntur district
Railway stations in Guntur railway division